The 1907 Norwegian Football Cup was the sixth season of the Norwegian annual knockout football tournament. The tournament was open for 1907 local association leagues (kretsserier) champions, except in Kristiania og omegn where a separate cup qualifying tournament was held. Mercantile won their first title.

Semi-finals

|colspan="3" style="background-color:#97DEFF"|21 September 1907

|}

Sarpsborg won on walkover.

Final

References

External links
RSSSF Football Archive

Norwegian Football Cup seasons
Norway
Football Cup